This is a list of notable Israeli Americans.  It includes both original immigrants who obtained American citizenship, and their American descendants.  The list is ordered by category of human endeavor. Persons with significant contributions in two fields are listed in both pertinent categories, to facilitate easy lookup.

To be included in this list, the person must have a Wikipedia article showing they are Israeli American, or must have independent references showing they are Israeli American and are notable.

Academics

 Ichak Adizes, management expert and best-selling author
 Reuven Amitai, historian, writer, and Dean of the Faculty of Humanities at the Hebrew University
 Dan Ariely, economist and author
 Robert Aumann, Nobel laureate
 Baruch Awerbuch, professor of computer science at Johns Hopkins University
 Arie S. Belldegrun, director of the UCLA Institute of Urologic Oncology and is professor and Chief of Urologic Oncology at the David Geffen School of Medicine
 Yochai Benkler, Berkman Professor of Entrepreneurial Legal Studies at Harvard Law School, and author 
 Yossef Bodansky, Israeli-born American political scientist
 Yaron Brook, president and executive director of the Ayn Rand Institute 
 Idit Harel Caperton, educational psychologist and epistemologist
 Avner Cohen, political scientist and historian well known his path-breaking history of the Israeli nuclear program and strategic policy
 Ezekiel Emanuel, bioethicist
 Zvi Galil (born 1947), computer scientist, mathematician, and President of Tel Aviv University
 Gerson Goldhaber, particle physicist and astrophysicist
 Sulamith Goldhaber, high-energy physicist and molecular spectroscopist
 Michael Goldsmith, law professor at Brigham Young University's J. Reuben Clark Law School
 Shafrira Goldwasser, professor of electrical engineering and computer science at MIT, and professor of mathematical sciences at the Weizmann Institute of Science
 Amos Grunebaum, ObGyn physician, inventor, professor Donald and Barbara Zucker School of Medicine at Hofstra/Northwell
 Amos N. Guiora, professor of law at the S. J. Quinney College of Law, University of Utah, and an expert on drone attacks
 Rabbi David Weiss Halivni, Israeli-American world-acclaimed scholar in the domain of Jewish Sciences and professor of Talmud
 Michael Harris, political scientist, author, and professor
 David Hazony, author and editor of The Tower Magazine
 Daniel Kahneman, Nobel laureate
 Ehud Kalai, Israeli-born American game theorist and mathematical economist, and James J. O’Connor Distinguished Professor of Decision and Game Sciences at Northwestern University
 Avi Loeb, astronomer
 Mario Livio, astrophysicist and author
 Jessica Meir, post-doctoral researcher in comparative physiology at the University of British Columbia
 Don Patinkin, monetary economist and the president of Hebrew University of Jerusalem
 Ithiel de Sola Pool, researcher in the field of social sciences
 Avital Ronell, philosopher, professor at New York University
 Emmanuel David Tannenbaum, biophysicist and applied mathematician, professor and researcher at the Ben-Gurion University of the Negev and the Georgia Institute of Technology 
 Rina Tannenbaum, materials scientist and chemical engineer and presently Professor at the University of Alabama at Birmingham
 Amnon Yariv, professor of applied physics and electrical engineering at California Institute of Technology
 Moshe Vardi, professor of computer science at Rice University

Actors

 Shiri Appleby, film and television actress
 Mili Avital, Israeli-born actress (Stargate)
 Amir Blumenfeld, Israeli-American writer, comedian, actor, and television host
 Steve Bond, Israeli-born television actor and model
 Yaniv Rokah, actor
 Assaf Cohen, actor
 Oded Fehr Israeli/American film and television actor (The Mummy, Resident Evil: Extinction)
 Alona Tal, actress
 Hani Furstenberg, actress
 Brian George, actor and voice actor 
 Omri Katz Israeli/American actor (Eerie, Indiana)
 Amos Lavi, stage and film actor, won three Ophir Awards (Sh'Chur, Nashim and Zirkus Palestina)
 Grayson McCouch, actor
 Jonah Lotan, actor
 Judith Light, actress
 Vince Offer, "the ShamWow! Guy", Israeli-American actor known for his appearance in the infomercials for the absorbent towels ShamWow! during the 2000s
 Natalie Portman Israeli-born American film star
 Daniella Rabbani, Israeli/American actress, singer, and voiceover artist
 Modi Rosenfeld, stand-up comedian, actor, and cantor 
 Odeya Rush, television and film actress (The Odd Life of Timothy Green, The Giver)
 Scott L. Schwartz, film and television actor and stuntman, and former professional wrestler
 Tami Stronach, Israeli-American actress (The Neverending Story)
 Raviv Ullman, Israeli-born American actor, teen idol (Phil of the Future)
 Inbar Lavi, actress
 Yael Grobglas, actress

Arts and entertainment
 Omri Amrany, sculptor and painter
 Carmit Bachar, singer, dancer, model, actress and showgirl; member of The Pussycat Dolls (Israeli father)
 Ralph Bakshi, Israeli-born animation film director
 Amir Bar-Lev, film director, producer, and writer
 Rhea Carmi, abstract expressionist and mixed-media artist 
 Elinor Carucci, photographer
 Lior Ron, composer
 Lyor Cohen, North American chairman and CEO of Recorded Music for Warner Music Group (WMG)
 Neil Druckmann, Israeli-born American writer, creative director and programmer for the video game developer Naughty Dog
 Ari Emanuel, talent agent and co-CEO of William Morris Endeavor (WME), and basis for the character Ari Gold on the TV show Entourage
 Amos Gitai, auteur filmmaker
 Usher Morgan, filmmaker, businessman and studio executive
 Maira Kalman, Israeli-born American illustrator, author, artist and designer
 Yael Kanarek, artist 
 Shuki Levy, Israeli-born American music composer whose best known work is soundtrack compositions for children's television programs of the 1980s.
 Ephrat Livni, artist, writer, and lawyer
 Rod Lurie, director, screenwriter, and film critic
 Arnon Milchan, Israeli-American film producer and businessman who produced many films such as The War of the Roses, Once Upon a Time in America, Pretty Woman, Natural Born Killers, The Devil's Advocate, and L.A. Confidential
 Oren Moverman, Israeli-American film director/screenwriter
 Avi Nesher, Israeli-born film producer, film director, screenwriter and actor
 Sassona Norton, Israeli-born sculptor and painter
 Eran Preis, director, screenwriter, playwright, and producer 
 Ari Sandel, film director (West Bank Story)
 Ophrah Shemesh, artist
 Boaz Yakin, screenwriter and film director
 Hila Klein, Israeli-born podcast host and designer.

Business 

 Shai Agassi, entrepreneur, founder and former CEO of Better Place
 Ori Allon, founder of Compass Inc., online real estate business in New York City
 Gadi Amit, entrepreneur and designer, head designer of Fitbit and NewDealDesign
 Avi Arad, Israeli-American businessman, founder of Marvel Studios
 Shari Arison, American-born Israeli businesswoman and philanthropist, one of Israel's wealthiest women
 Arison family, founders of Carnival Cruise Lines, the largest cruise line in the world
 Naftali Bennett, politician, former software entrepreneur, and former Prime Minister of Israel
 Yaron Brook, entrepreneur, author, and economist, who currently serves as the president and executive director of the Ayn Rand Institute
 Safra Catz, CEO of the Oracle Corporation
 Jacob Frenkel, economist and businessman; served as Governor of the Bank of Israel; currently the Chairman of JPMorgan Chase International
 Hillel Fuld, tech marketer and advisor, blogger and global tech speaker. CMO of Zula and Zcast among many other tech startup companies.
 Orit Gadiesh, corporate strategist and chairwoman of management consulting firm Bain & Company
 Gideon Gartner, entrepreneur and philanthropist, founder of Gartner, an information technology (IT) research and advisory company 
 Yoram Globus, film producer, former co-owner of the Cannon Group, Inc.
 Noam Gottesman, former hedge fund manager; co-founded GLG Partners
 Andi Gutmans, co-founder of Zend Technologies, co-creator of PHP, General Manager at Amazon Web Services (AWS)
 Abraham Karem, inventor of the drone, founder of Karem Aircraft
 Ynon Kreiz, entrepreneur and businessman, former CEO of Fox Kids Europe, Endemol and Maker Studios
 Avi Lerner, film producer, co-founder of Nu Image, owner of Bulgaria-based Nu Boyana Film Studios
 Arnon Milchan, founder and owner of New Regency Films, second wealthiest mogul in Hollywood
 Adam Milstein, real estate investor, entrepreneur, and active philanthropist
 Adam Mosseri, head of Instagram
 Shaul Olmert, co-founder of online publishing platform Playbuzz, former VP of digital products for MTV Networks; son of Ehud Olmert
 Guy Oseary, Israeli-American businessman; Madonna's manager
 Isaac Perlmutter, chairman of Marvel Entertainment, former co-owner of Toy Biz
 Shai Reshef, educational entrepreneur and founder and president of University of the People 
 Meshulam Riklis, businessman
 Lior Ron, entrepreneur, co-founder of autonomous trucking company Otto, former lead of Google Maps
 Haim Saban, television and media proprietor notable for his adaptations of Power Rangers; ranked by Forbes as the 98th richest person in America
 Tamir Sapir, Israeli-Georgian-American businessman; earned billions in the 1980s bartering fertilizers for oil; in 2006 was ranked at position 160 in list of the 400 richest Americans, with an estimated fortune of $2 billion
 Eli Tene, businessman, co-founder, co-managing director, and principal of the Peak Corporate Network
 Boaz Weinstein, derivatives trader and hedge fund manager, and founder of Saba Capital Management
 Jerry Zucker, former CEO of the InterTech Group and the Polymer Group

Fashion

 Yigal Azrouël, fashion designer
 Donna Feldman, American model, daughter of Israeli parents
 Sharon Genish, Israeli/American model
 Yael Markovich, Israeli/American model
 Nili Lotan, fashion designer
 Max Rhyser, Danish-American-Israeli model, stage, television and film actor
 Yotam Solomon, fashion designer
 Elie Tahari, founder of fashion label Elie Tahari

Government and politics

 Rahm Emanuel, former White House Chief of Staff and former mayor of Chicago
 Ari Ne'eman, disability rights activist
 Stanley Fischer, served as Governor of the Bank of Israel and later as Vice Chairman of the United States Federal Reserve
 Mazi Melesa Pilip, Ethiopian-born politician
 Josh Reinstein, director of the Knesset Christian Allies Caucus

Journalism

 Irin Carmon, feminist author, blogger, and television personality
 Michael Dorfman, Russian-Israeli essayist and human rights activist
 Hadas Gold, politics, media and global business reporter for CNN
 Daniel Pearl, journalist and South Asia Bureau Chief of the Wall Street Journal, who was kidnapped and murdered in Pakistan.
 Nicole Lapin, anchor on CNBC and CNN Live
 Liel Leibovitz, journalist, author, media critic and video game scholar
 Haviv Rettig Gur, journalist at The Times of Israel, Former Director of Communications for the Jewish Agency
 Hanna Rosin, journalist

Literature
 Nick Simmons, comic book writer, musician, and voice over actor
 Leora Skolkin-Smith, novelist (Edges: O Israel, O Palestine)
 Ayelet Waldman, novelist and essayist

Musicians

 The Alchemist, hip hop producer and rapper
 Leigh Daniel Avidan, member of Ninja Sex Party and co-host of Internet webseries Game Grumps.
 Carmit Bachar, member of the pop group, The Pussycat Dolls
 Didi Benami, American singer who is best known for being a finalist on the ninth season of American Idol. Daughter of an Israeli Jewish father.
 Ofer Ben-Amots, Israeli-American composer and professor of composition at Colorado College.
 Miri Ben-Ari, hip-hop violinist plays songs with emcee Twista and R&B singer Alicia Keys
 Ill Bill, rapper
 Yefim Bronfman, Soviet-born Israeli-American pianist
 Kosha Dillz, hip hop MC
 David Draiman, lead vocalist for heavy metal band Disturbed
 Eli Eban, clarinetist
 Meir Finkelstein, cantor and composer of contemporary Jewish liturgical music
 Yuval Gabay, hip hop drummer
 Goapele, African-American soul and R&B singer-songwriter, daughter of a New York-born Israeli Jewish mother
 Este, Danielle and Alana Haim, Grammy-nominated musicians of the rock band HAIM. 
 Yehuda Hanani, international soloist, recording artist, cellist, and Professor of Violoncello at the University of Cincinnati College-Conservatory of Music
 , singer-songwriter, member of Israeli boy-band Hi-Five.
 Eyran Katsenelenbogen, jazz pianist
 Joseph Malovany, tenor soloist, cantor of New York's Fifth Avenue Synagogue, and Distinguished Professor of Liturgical Music at Philip and Sarah Belz School of Jewish Music, Yeshiva University 
 Necro, rapper, producer, director, and record label owner; younger brother of Ill Bill
 Itzhak Perlman, violin virtuoso
 Shulamit Ran, composer, won the Pulitzer Prize
 J.R. Rotem, record producer and songwriter
 Gil Shaham, Israeli American award-winning violinist
 Mordecai Shehori, pianist
 Itaal Shur, composer, producer, and musician
 Gene Simmons, guitarist and singer-songwriter from KISS, Israeli-born
 Hillel Slovak, original guitarist of the band Red Hot Chili Peppers, Israeli-born
 Emanuel Vardi, violist
 Elliott Yamin, American singer, third place finalist on the fifth season of American Idol
 Inon Zur, Israeli American award-winning music composer
 Sean Hurwitz, musician and singer
 Israela Margalit, pianist and playwright

Religion
 Eliyahu Ben Haim (born 1940), Orthodox rabbi and Av Beth Din (religious judge)
 Yitzhak Israeli, Orthodox rabbi    
 Yosef Mizrachi, Orthodox Judaism outreach rabbi

Sports

 Ike Berger (born 1936), Olympic and world champion weightlifter
Sue Bird (born 1980), point guard for the Seattle Storm; first overall pick in the 2002 WNBA Draft; two-time Olympic champion; four-time All-Star
 Adam Bisnowaty (born 1993), football player for the New York Giants of the NFL
 David Blatt (born 1959), Head Coach of the Cleveland Cavaliers, NBA franchise
 David Blu (born 1980), professional basketball player for Maccabi Tel Aviv
 Ryan Braun (born 1983), major league baseball player
 Tal Brody (born 1943), professional basketball player for Maccabi Tel Aviv
 Jake Cohen (born 1990), professional basketball player for Maccabi Tel Aviv and the Israeli national basketball team
 John DiBartolomeo (born 1991), professional basketball player for Israeli powerhouse Maccabi Tel Aviv
 Eva Fabian (born 1993), world champion swimmer
 Jordan Farmar (born 1986), basketball player for the Sacramento Kings
 Roy Fink (born 1977), retired soccer player and coach
 D'or Fischer, professional basketball player
 Mordechai Haim, soccer player
 Ian Kinsler (born 1982), major league baseball player
 Dean Kremer (born 1996), baseball pitcher for the Baltimore Orioles
 Sylven Landesberg (born 1990), basketball player for Maccabi Tel Aviv 
 Brad Leaf (born 1960), professional basketball player 
 T. J. Leaf (born 1997), NBA player for the Indiana Pacers
 Ben Lederman (born 2000), American-Israeli-Polish soccer player
 Boyd "Rainmaker" Melson (born 1981), light middleweight boxer
 Jeron Roberts (born 1976),  basketball player for the Israeli national team
 Kenny Hasan Sayef (born 1993), soccer player for Belgian club K.A.A. Gent
 Jon Scheyer (born 1987), professional basketball player
 Derrick Sharp (born 1971), basketball player
 Alana Shipp (born 1982), IFBB professional bodybuilder
 Eliot Teltscher (born 1959), professional top-10 tennis player
 Alex Tyus (born 1988), professional basketball player
 Alex Zahavi (born 1991), soccer player 
 Daria Zuravicki (born 1985), figure skater
 Ben Lederman (born 2000), football player

Other
 Nava Applebaum, 20-year-old woman killed together with her father Dr. David Applebaum on the evening before her wedding by a Palestinian suicide bomber
 Michael Arad, architect who won the design competition for the World Trade Center Memorial in New York City in 2004
 Juval Aviv, security consultant and writer
 Ron Ben-Israel, pastry chef
 Ronnie Bardah, poker player and Survivor: Island of the Idols contestant
 Carol Shaya Castro, former New York City police officer and actress whose employment was terminated after she appeared in Playboy magazine
 Eli Elezra, world-class poker player
 Tamar Geller, dog trainer who developed "the Loved Dog" method of dog training
 Chaim Gingold, noted for design work with the computer game Spore
 Gavriel Holtzberg, Orthodox rabbi and Chabad emissary to Mumbai, India, killed by Pakistani Islamist militants in the 2008 Mumbai attacks
 Ami James, tattoo artist, businessman, and media personality (Miami Ink)
 Cheryl Saban, philanthropist, woman's advocate, and wife of billionaire entertainment mogul Haim Saban
 Michael Solomonov, chef and restaurateur

See also
 Israelis
 List of notable Israelis
 Lists of American Jews
 Israeli diaspora
 Yerida
 Middle Eastern Americans

References

References are given within the articles themselves.

Americans
Lists of American people by ethnic or national origin
Israeli